= Germaine de Coster =

French printmaker

Germaine de Coster (1895–1992) was a French printmaker.

Her work is included in the collections of the Musée national des beaux-arts du Québec, the National Gallery of Art, Washington and the Centre Pompidou, Paris.
